Tim Low (born 1956) is an Australian biologist and author of articles and books on nature and conservation. His seventh book, Where Song Began: Australia's Birds and How They Changed the World, became the first nature book ever to win the Australian Book Industry Awards prize for best General Non Fiction, in 2015. In the same year it was shortlisted for the NSW Premier's History Awards. An earlier book, Feral Future, inspired the formation of an NGO, the Invasive Species Council. His earlier books helped popularise Australian bush tucker. Four of his books have won national prizes.

For twenty years Low wrote a column in Nature Australia, Australia's leading nature magazine. He contributes to Wildlife Australia, Australian Geographic, Australian Birdlife and other magazines.
 
Low became very interested in reptiles as a teenager and discovered several new species of lizard. He named the chain-backed dtella (Gehyra catenata) and had the dwarf litter-skink (Menetia timlowi) named after him. His interests expanded to include plants, birds, mammals, fish and invertebrates. He has written journal articles that caution about the weed threats posed by biofuel crops, agroforestry trees and pasture plants.

He works as an environmental consultant, writer and photographer, serves on government committees and does public speaking. He has written many reports about climate change and received a Churchill Fellowship to study its impacts on wildlife. His photos have appeared in many books, including on covers. He is the patron of Rainforest Rescue. Low lives in Brisbane.

A species of lizard, Pygmaeascincus timlowi, is named in his honor.

Bibliography
 Where Song Began (2014) As well as winning the non fiction prize at the Australian Book Industry Awards it won People's Choice at the Victorian Premier's Literary Awards. It featured on several best seller lists.  
The New Nature: Winners & Losers in Wild Australia (2002) looks at how animals and plants sometimes respond to human impacts in a positive way. It won the Westfield/Waverley Award for Literature and was listed as a number one best seller in New Scientist (Australia).
Feral Future: The Untold Story of Australia's Exotic Invaders (1999) was published in Australia and republished in North America. It was listed by New Scientist (Australia) as a best-seller.
Bush Medicine (1990) and Bush Tucker (1990) were coffee table books, both of which won national prizes. They featured Low's photography as well as his text.
Wild Food Plants of Australia (1989) has been through more than ten printings and remains the standard field guide to wild edible plants in Australia.
Wild Herbs of Australia and New Zealand (1985) is a guide to cooking and eating weeds.

Low has also written chapters or sections in Australia's Biodiversity and Climate Change (CSIRO), Encyclopedia of Biological Invasions (University of California Press), The Mammals of Australia (Reed New Holland), Field Companion to Mammals of Australia (New Holland), Considering Animals: Contemporary Studies in Human-Animal Relations (Ashgate), Biodiversity & The Precautionary Principle, (Earthscan), Frontier Country (Weldon), Everyday Life through the Ages (Reader's Digest), Encyclopaedia of Australian Wildlife (Reader's Digest), Wild Places of Greater Brisbane (Queensland Museum), Toxic Plants & Animals (Queensland Museum), Foods that Harm, Foods that Heal (Reader's Digest)

References

Footnotes

Notations
 Low, Tim, Wild Food Plants of Australia,

External links
 Tim Low's website
 Tim Low's author profile at Penguin Books Australia

Living people
Australian conservationists
1956 births